Tafo is a town in the Ashanti Region of Ghana.

Places
Old Tafo in the Ashanti Region
New Tafo in Kumasi
Akim Tafo in the Eastern Region